The 2021 Emperor's Cup Final was the final of the 2021 Emperor's Cup, the 101st edition of the Emperor's Cup.

The match was contested at the Japan National Stadium in Tokyo.

Teams

Road to the final

Format 
The final was played as a single match. If tied after regulation time, extra time and, would it necessary, a penalty shoot-out would have been used to decide the winning team.

Details

References

External links 
 Emperor's Cup JFA 101st Japan Football Championship 
 天皇杯 JFA 第101回全日本サッカー選手権大会 

Emperor's Cup
2021 in Japanese football
Urawa Red Diamonds matches
Oita Trinita matches
2021 in Asian football
2021 in Japanese sport
Emperors Cup Final, 2021